Jim Jarmusch is an American independent filmmaker and screenwriter. His filmography includes thirteen feature films, two documentaries, six music videos, and four short films. In addition, Jarmusch has worked on several other films and has appeared on screen on multiple occasions as an actor and as himself.

Films as director

Feature films

Documentary films

Music videos

Short films

Screen appearances

Acting credits

Appearances as himself

Other production credits

References

External links
 , including an extensive filmography
 Jim Jarmusch filmography from Senses of Cinema
 Jim Jarmusch filmography at the Jim Jarmusch Resource Page, including several unrealized projects

Jarmusch, Jim